The 2021 Extreme Rules was the 13th annual Extreme Rules professional wrestling pay-per-view (PPV) and livestreaming event produced by WWE. It was held for wrestlers from the promotion's Raw and SmackDown brand divisions. The event took place on September 26, 2021, at the Nationwide Arena in Columbus, Ohio, and was the first Extreme Rules to air on the livestreaming service Peacock. It was also the first and so far only Extreme Rules event to be held in September, replacing Clash of Champions that was previously held during that month; Extreme Rules was moved to October the following year. 

The event was originally scheduled to take place on July 18 at the SAP Center in San Jose, California, but it was postponed and relocated due to issues stemming from the COVID-19 pandemic in 2020. Although the concept of Extreme Rules is that the event features various hardcore-based matches, for the 2021 event, only the main event match was contested under a hardcore stipulation. The 2021 event also saw a return to its original name, after the previous year's event was titled as The Horror Show at Extreme Rules. Notably, this event was also the first Extreme Rules event where no titles changed hands—five championships were defended and retained.

Seven matches were contested at the event, including one on the Kickoff pre-show. In the main event, Roman Reigns defeated "The Demon" Finn Bálor in an Extreme Rules match to retain SmackDown's Universal Championship. In other prominent matches, The Usos (Jey Uso and Jimmy Uso) defeated The Street Profits (Angelo Dawkins and Montez Ford) to retain the SmackDown Tag Team Championship, SmackDown Women's Champion Becky Lynch faced Bianca Belair, which ended in a no contest after Sasha Banks made her return and subsequently ambushed both competitors, and Damian Priest defeated Jeff Hardy and Sheamus in a triple threat match to retain Raw's United States Championship.

The event received mixed-to-negative reviews from critics and fans, who mainly criticized the lack of stipulation matches.

Production

Background

Extreme Rules is an annual gimmick event produced by WWE since 2009. The concept of the show is that the event features various matches that are contested under hardcore rules and generally features one Extreme Rules match. The defunct Extreme Championship Wrestling promotion, which WWE acquired in 2003, originally used the "extreme rules" term to describe the regulations for all of its matches; WWE adopted the term and has since used it in place of "hardcore match" or "hardcore rules." The previous year's event was titled The Horror Show at Extreme Rules, due to having horror-themed matches on its card; the 2021 event would mark a return to its original name. The 2021 event was the 13th event under the Extreme Rules chronology and featured wrestlers from the Raw and SmackDown brands. The event aired on pay-per-view worldwide and was available to livestream on the WWE Network in international markets, and was the first Extreme Rules to livestream on Peacock after the American version of the WWE Network merged under Peacock in March.

The 2020 Extreme Rules event was originally to take place at the SAP Center in San Jose, California, but had to be relocated to the WWE Performance Center in Orlando, Florida and held behind closed doors due to the COVID-19 pandemic. The SAP Center put out an official statement that they would instead host the 2021 event. The venue also announced that there would be no refunds (unless a new date was not determined within 60 days), but tickets purchased would be honored for the following year's event. However, in May 2021, it was reported that due to the ongoing pandemic, the 2021 event would be held on July 18 from the WWE ThunderDome bio-secure bubble at the Yuengling Center in Tampa, Florida, but after WWE announced that they would be resuming live touring in mid-July, that date was instead given to Money in the Bank. On July 9, 2021, WWE then announced that Extreme Rules would be held on September 26 at the Nationwide Arena in Columbus, Ohio, which were the initial reported date and venue for Clash of Champions.

Storylines
The event comprised seven matches, including one on the Kickoff pre-show, that resulted from scripted storylines, where wrestlers portrayed heroes, villains, or less distinguishable characters in scripted events that built tension and culminated in a wrestling match or series of matches. Results were predetermined by WWE's writers on the Raw and SmackDown brands, while storylines were produced on WWE's weekly television shows, Monday Night Raw and Friday Night SmackDown.

On the July 23 episode of SmackDown, after Roman Reigns declined John Cena's challenge to a match for the Universal Championship at SummerSlam, Finn Bálor challenged Reigns for the title at the event, which Reigns accepted. During the contract signing, however, an altercation occurred, resulting in Cena signing the contract and becoming Reigns' opponent at SummerSlam where Reigns retained. Bálor then got his opportunity at the title on the September 3 episode of SmackDown, but he was unsuccessful. A rematch between the two for the Universal Championship was scheduled for Extreme Rules. On the September 10 episode, it was revealed that Reigns would be facing Bálor's alter ego, "The Demon", and it was later stipulated to be an Extreme Rules match.

At SummerSlam, Bianca Belair was originally set to defend the SmackDown Women's Championship against Sasha Banks. However, Banks was unable to appear for unknown reasons. Carmella was then announced as Banks' replacement. Before the match could begin, however, Becky Lynch, in her first appearance since the Raw after Money in the Bank in May 2020, made a surprise return, attacked Carmella, challenged Belair, and subsequently defeated her in 26 seconds to win the title. On the following SmackDown, Belair challenged Lynch to a rematch, however, Lynch refused. Belair then won a fatal four-way elimination match to become the number one contender. The following week, Belair challenged Lynch to a match for that night, but Lynch again refused, stating she would defend the title when she was ready. Later backstage, WWE officials Adam Pearce and Sonya Deville told Lynch that she would defend the title against Belair at Extreme Rules.

At SummerSlam, Damian Priest defeated Sheamus to win the United States Championship. On the August 30 episode of Raw, Priest retained the title against Sheamus and Drew McIntyre in a triple threat match. On the following episode, Sheamus defeated McIntyre to earn a United States Championship match against Priest at Extreme Rules. On the September 20 episode, Jeff Hardy defeated Sheamus to earn a spot in the title match at Extreme Rules, thus making it a triple threat match.

On the September 17 episode of SmackDown, during a tag team match, Liv Morgan sent Carmella into a turnbuckle. The impact caused Carmella to break her nose, and for Morgan's team to win via countout. Afterwards, Morgan challenged Carmella to a match at Extreme Rules, and Carmella later accepted. The match was later scheduled for the Kickoff pre-show.

On the August 23 episode of Raw, while Charlotte Flair was talking about her Raw Women's Championship win at SummerSlam two days prior, she was confronted by Alexa Bliss, who held a doll named "Lilly". Bliss said that she only wanted to say "Hi". Two weeks later, after Flair's successful title defense, Bliss appeared on the TitanTron and asked Flair to come to "the playground", only for Flair to refuse. Flair then offered Bliss a title match at Extreme Rules.

On the August 27 episode of SmackDown, after Finn Bálor challenged Roman Reigns for the Universal Championship for the following week, SmackDown Tag Team Champions The Usos (Jey Uso and Jimmy Uso) attacked Bálor, only for The Street Profits (Angelo Dawkins and Montez Ford) to lay out The Usos, with Reigns looking on from outside the ring. The following week, The Street Profits defeated The Usos via disqualification when The Usos ignored the referee's five count, after which, The Street Profits stood tall. A title match between the two teams took place on the September 10 episode, where The Street Profits again won via disqualification, this time after interference from Reigns. On September 16, another title match between the two teams was scheduled for Extreme Rules.

Event

Pre-show 
During the Extreme Rules Kickoff pre-show, while The New Day (WWE Champion Big E, Kofi Kingston, and Xavier Woods) were interviewed backstage after arriving at the arena, they were confronted by AJ Styles and Omos. Bobby Lashley then attacked Big E from behind and all six men brawled. Shortly thereafter, backstage personnel separated them. A six-man tag team match was announced for the main card.

Also during the pre-show, Liv Morgan faced Carmella. Before the match, Carmella insulted Morgan by stating that Morgan was not beautiful. Morgan then attacked Carmella from behind and the match began. In the end, Morgan threw Carmella into the announce table. Back in the ring, Morgan performed a Springboard Flatliner on Carmella to win the match.

Preliminary matches 
The actual pay-per-view opened with The New Day (WWE Champion Big E, Kofi Kingston, and Xavier Woods) facing Bobby Lashley, AJ Styles, and Omos in a six-man tag team match. During the match, Kingston tried to make the tag to Big E, but Lashley pulled Big E off the apron and attacked him. Woods tagged in and performed a Tornado DDT on Lashley for a nearfall. Lashley then performed a Running Powerslam on Woods for a nearfall. Big E tagged in and hit three Belly-to-Belly Suplexes and a Warrior Splash on Styles. Big E and Kingston performed a Double Stomp/Powerbomb combination on Styles, but Lashley broke up the pin. Lashley went for a Spear, but Kingston sent him outside the ring. Kingston went for a Suicide Dive on Lashley, but Omos caught Kingston in mid-air with a Chop. As Lashley went for the Spear on Big E, Styles tagged himself in and missed a Phenomenal Forearm on Big E while Lashley tagged himself in and Lashley accidentally executed a Spear on Styles. Big E executed a Big Ending on Lashley to win the match.

Next, The Usos (Jey Uso and Jimmy Uso) defended the WWE SmackDown Tag Team Championship against The Street Profits (Angelo Dawkins and Montez Ford). The Usos attacked the injured ribs on Ford throughout the match. Towards the end, The Street Profits performed a Blockbuster on Jimmy, and Ford got a nearfall. The Usos threw Dawkins into the barricade and Ford hit a Running Flip Dive on both Jey and Jimmy. Back in the ring, Ford executed a Frog Splash on Jey for a nearfall. The Usos executed a Double Superkick on Dawkins and one to Ford. The Usos followed up with a Double Superfly Splash on Ford to retain the titles.

After that, Charlotte Flair defended the Raw Women's Championship against Alexa Bliss. During the match, Flair attempted a Top Rope Moonsault, but Bliss moved, however, Flair landed on her feet and performed a Moonsault for a nearfall. Flair missed Natural Selection and Bliss performed a Sunset Flip Powerbomb for a nearfall. Bliss went for Twisted Bliss, but Flair moved. Flair went for the Figure-Eight, Bliss countered into an Inside Cradle for a nearfall. Bliss executed a DDT, but Flair got her foot on the bottom rope. Flair grabbed Lilly and threw it at Bliss, causing a distraction for Flair to execute the Queen's Boot and Natural Selection to retain the title. Afterwards, Flair attacked Bliss and ripped Lilly apart. A distraught Bliss sat in the ring and cried while holding Lily's remnants.

In the fourth match, Damien Priest defended the United States Championship in a triple threat match against Jeff Hardy and Sheamus. As the match started, Sheamus performed a Brogue Kick on Hardy. During the match, Priest performed a Falcon Arrow on Hardy, but Sheamus broke up the pin. On the outside, Sheamus threw Priest into the ring post. Hardy performed Double Whisper in the Wind and got a nearfall on Sheamus. Sheamus applied the Cloverleaf on Hardy, but Priest broke it up. Sheamus performed the White Noise on Priest, but Hardy broke up the pin. Hardy hit the Twist of Fate on both Priest and Sheamus. In the end, Hardy performed the Swanton Bomb onto both Priest and Sheamus. Sheamus performed a Brogue Kick on Hardy, and Priest rolled up Sheamus to retain the title.

In the penultimate match, Becky Lynch defended the SmackDown Women's Championship against Bianca Belair. Belair went for the Kiss of Death, but Lynch got out of the ring. Lynch then went for the Manhandle Slam and the Dis-Arm-Her, but Belair countered both times. Towards the end on the outside, Lynch performed a Hurricanrana to Belair into the steel steps. Back in the ring, Lynch attempted an Armbar, but Belair countered into a Powerbomb for a nearfall. Lynch locked in the Dis-Arm-Her, but Belair countered and went for the Kiss of Death, but Sasha Banks returned and attacked Belair, causing a no contest with Lynch retaining the title. Afterwards, Banks laid out both Belair and Lynch with a Backstabber.

Main event 
In the main event, Roman Reigns defended the Universal Championship against "The Demon" Finn Bálor in an Extreme Rules match. During the match, Bálor attacked Reigns with a bundle of kendo sticks taped together. Bálor pulled out a table, but Reigns performed the Running Driveby Dropkick to put Bálor head first into the ring post. The two brawled into the crowd where Bálor executed a Crossbody, putting Reigns through a table. Back in the ring, Reigns put Bálor through a table with a Uranage for a nearfall. Reigns executed a Superman Punch on Bálor for a nearfall. Reigns executed a Spear on Bálor and kicked out while also delivering a low blow to Reigns. Bálor executed the Coup de Grâce on Reigns, but The Usos (Jey Uso and Jimmy Uso) came out and pulled Bálor out of the ring. Bálor put Jey through the announce table with a Powerbomb. Reigns speared Bálor through the barricade. With everyone down, red lights flashed and a heartbeat sound was heard as The Demon rose to his feet and attacked Reigns with a steel chair and put him through a table. As Bálor went for the Coup de Grâce, the top rope snapped and Bálor fell and hurt his knee. Reigns performed a Spear on Bálor to retain the title.

Aftermath
The 2021 Extreme Rules would be the only Extreme Rules to be held in September, as the following year's event was held in October, which was the first time the event took place on that month.

Raw
The next night's episode of Raw opened with Big E defending the WWE Championship against former champion Bobby Lashley, which ended via disqualification due to New Day's Kofi Kingston and Xavier Woods interfering with Cedric Alexander and Shelton Benjamin, hinting a reunion of The Hurt Business. A rematch took place later in the main event which was stipulated as a Steel Cage match to prevent interference where Big E defeated Lashley to retain the championship.

United States Champion Damian Priest defended the title against Sheamus in a no disqualification match, where Priest retained once again.

Raw Women's Champion Charlotte Flair issued an open challenge for the championship after claiming that she had beaten every woman on the roster. The challenge was answered by Doudrop, who lost the match due to interference from Eva Marie.

SmackDown 
On the following episode of SmackDown, it was announced that Becky Lynch would defend the SmackDown Women's Championship against Bianca Belair and Sasha Banks in a triple threat match at Crown Jewel. Also on that same episode, Banks and Belair had their match, which Banks won after interference from Lynch. The three signed the contract for their match the following week, and a brawl ensued, with Belair standing tall after sending Lynch onto Banks and through a table. Banks then faced Lynch on the October 15 episode, which Banks won after interference from Belair.

Liv Morgan and Carmella were scheduled to have a rematch on the following SmackDown, but the match never officially started as Carmella was provided with a "bedazzled carbon-fiber mask" and laid out Morgan. The two then had a rematch the following week, which was also a quarterfinal match for the inaugural Queen's Crown tournament, the female version of the King of the Ring tournament. Carmella won to advance in the tournament. On the October 15 episode, Morgan grabbed Carmella's mask, causing her to lose in the semifinals. Their feud would continue on Raw after both were drafted to that brand during the 2021 WWE Draft, where Carmella defeated Morgan on the October 25 episode, but Morgan won a fatal five-way match by pinning Carmella to become the number one contender for the Raw Women's Championship.

Also on the following episode of SmackDown, the 2021 WWE Draft began and concluded with the October 4 episode of Raw. The results of the draft went into effect beginning with the October 22 episode of SmackDown, the night after Crown Jewel.

Results

References

External links
 

WWE Extreme Rules
2021 WWE Network events
2021 WWE pay-per-view events
2021 in Ohio
Professional wrestling in Columbus, Ohio
Events in Columbus, Ohio
September 2021 events in the United States